Batya Bagully (born 23 June 2001) is a Kazakhstani women's football striker currently playing for San Diego Surf in San Diego California. She has been a member of the Kazakhstan National teams since debuting at age 14 in 2016 in UEFA Development tournament in FYR Macedonia.

References

2001 births
Living people
Kazakhstani women's footballers
Kazakhstan women's international footballers
Women's association football forwards
Hawaii Rainbow Wahine soccer players
Women's Premier Soccer League players
Kazakhstani expatriate sportspeople in the United States
Kazakhstani expatriate footballers
Expatriate women's soccer players in the United States